The 2012 LFL Canada Season was the fourth season in the Lingerie Football League. LFL Canada features four teams in four cities across Canada. For the 2012 season the League granted three new franchises: BC Angels, Regina Rage and the Saskatoon Sirens. The Toronto Triumph, who began play in the LFL's original U.S. league in 2011, carried over to LFL Canada; they have moved from the Ricoh Coliseum to the Hershey Centre in Mississauga, Ontario.

Unlike previous seasons, for this season the LFL would only play in Canada, with the exception of a handful of exhibition games around the world. The LFL announced in April 2012 that its U.S. teams would not play their 2012 season, anticipating a move to a spring schedule.

LFL Canada Lingerie Bowl I was played on November 17, 2012, between the Saskatoon Sirens and the BC Angels at the Abbotsford Entertainment & Sports Centre in Abbotsford, British Columbia, one week before the CFL's Grey Cup. The BC Angels won the inaugural championship game 25-12 with BC Angels' quarterback Mary Ann Hanson the game's MVP.

Developments
On February 9, 2012, the LFL announced that Abbotsford, British Columbia, would be the next Canadian city to host a team in the League. The franchise would play its home games at the Abbotsford Entertainment & Sports Centre and will compete in the Western Division of LFL Canada. On February 20, 2012, the LFL announced that the franchise will be named the BC Angels following the results of an online fan vote. The decision for Abbotsford to host a team sparked some controversy, including expressed concern from at least one city councillor, as "Abbotsford is a deeply religious agricultural community."

On February 22, 2012, the LFL announced that Regina, Saskatchewan would be the next Canadian city to host a team in the League.  Home games would be played at the Brandt Centre.  On March 6, the LFL announced that the franchise will be named the Regina Rage after an online fan vote.

Six days later, on February 28, the LFL announced that Saskatoon, Saskatchewan would join Regina as LFL Canada's second team in the Wheat Province.  Home games would be played at the Credit Union Centre. Upon releasing the Saskatoon Sirens' logo and colours, the league announced that LFL Canada was set at four teams for the 2012 season, with the league playing an eight-game schedule, still scheduled to end with the Canadian Lingerie Bowl the day before the Grey Cup. The Canadian Lingerie Bowl was later rescheduled to start one week before the Grey Cup, due in part to a schedule conflict with the Vanier Cup, the Canadian college football championship.

Teams

Schedule
The 2012 season featured eight games, all scheduled on Saturdays, with each team playing two home and two road games. As the LFL has done in the United States, the league scheduled a bye week on Thanksgiving weekend. In addition a second bye week was built into the schedule for the week of September 22, 2012.

Lingerie Bowl Canada I

Standings

 - clinched playoff berth   - eliminated from playoffs''

References

Lingerie Football League
Lingerie Football League
Legends Football League